Tom Wickert (born April 5, 1952) is a former American football tackle and guard. He played for the Miami Dolphins in 1974, the New Orleans Saints from 1975 to 1976 and for the Detroit Lions and Kansas City Chiefs in 1977.

References

1952 births
Living people
American football offensive tackles
American football offensive guards
Washington State Cougars football players
Miami Dolphins players
New Orleans Saints players
Detroit Lions players
Kansas City Chiefs players
Redwood High School (Larkspur, California) alumni